Eestimaa Õlikonsortsium was an oil shale company located in Sillamäe, Estonia. The company was established in 1926.  It was a Swedish–Norwegian consortium controlled by Marcus Wallenberg. Main shareholders were Investor AB, AB Emissionsinstitutet, and Norsk Hydro.

The consortium built a tunnel oven in 1928. However, due to recession, production halted in 1930 and was not restarted until 1936, when it was reorganized as Baltic Oil Company.  A second tunnel oven was added in 1938.  In 1936, it produced 15,000 tonnes of oil, including 2,400 tonnes of gasoline.

In July 1938, Eestimaa Õlikonsortsium concluded a contract with the German Kriegsmarine to supply shale oil as a ship fuel.  In 1939, it produced 36,944 tonnes of shale oil. After occupation of Estonia by the Soviet Union, the company was nationalized in 1940.  According to Soviet-Swedish agreement of 1941, the Soviet Union made a one-time payment in 1947, covering only part of the company's value.

See also

 Eesti Kiviõli
 Eesti Küttejõud
 Esimene Eesti Põlevkivitööstus
 New Consolidated Gold Fields
 Oil shale in Estonia

References

Bibliography 

 

Oil shale companies of Estonia
Defunct energy companies of Estonia
Defunct oil companies
Defunct mining companies
Sillamäe
Synthetic fuel companies
Energy companies established in 1926
Non-renewable resource companies established in 1926
Non-renewable resource companies disestablished in 1940
1926 establishments in Estonia
1940s disestablishments in Estonia
Companies nationalised by the Soviet Union